Annales d'histochimie was a peer-reviewed scientific journal established in 1956. The journal covered the field of histochemistry.

External links
 Record at United States National Library of Medicine

Publications established in 1956
Biology journals
Chemistry journals
Publications disestablished in 1976
Quarterly journals